Sounds was a UK weekly pop/rock music newspaper, published from 10 October 1970 to 6 April 1991. It was known for giving away posters in the centre of the paper (initially black and white, then colour from late 1971) and later for covering heavy metal (especially the new wave of British heavy metal (NWOBHM)) and punk and Oi! music in its late 1970s–early 1980s heyday.

History

It was produced by Spotlight Publications (part of Morgan Grampian), which was set up by John Thompson and Jo Saul with Jack Hutton and Peter Wilkinson, who left Melody Maker to start their own company. Sounds was their first project, a weekly paper devoted to progressive rock and described by Hutton, to those he was attempting to recruit from his former publication, as "a leftwing Melody Maker". Sounds was intended to be a weekly rival to titles such as Melody Maker and New Musical Express (NME).

Sounds was one of the first music papers to cover punk. Mick Middles covered the Manchester music scene for Sounds from 1978 to 1982 writing about many of the up and coming bands of the time from Buzzcocks and Slaughter & The Dogs to The Fall and Joy Division. John Robb joined in 1987 and used the term "Britpop" to refer to bands such as the La's, the Stone Roses and Inspiral Carpets, although it did not develop into the Britpop genre/movement at that time (as these acts were grouped under labels such as Baggy, Madchester and indie-dance).

Keith Cameron wrote about Nirvana after Robb carried out the first interview with them.

The Obscurist Chart ran for about a year, first appearing on 5 September 1981 issue, as an alternative to the main, sales-driven record charts, allowing bands and music outside the mainstream to be recognised. The chart was started by Paul Platypus, who played with Mark Perry in The Reflections and compiled the first nine charts. The last chart appeared in 11 December 1982 issue.

In 1987, Morgan-Grampian had been acquired by United News and Media (later to become United Business Media), first as part of the United Advertising Publications (UAP) division and later as part of the then CMP Information portfolio. A legacy of Sounds was the creation of the heavy metal/rock magazine Kerrang!, which was originally issued as a supplement before being spun off as a separate publication.

Sounds was one of the trinity of British music weeklies, along with NME and Melody Maker, that were colloquially known as 'The Inkies'. Sounds folded in 1991 after the parent company, United Newspapers, decided to concentrate on trade papers like Music Week and so sold most of their consumer magazines titles to EMAP Metro, with Sounds being closed at the same time as its sister music magazine, the more chart and dance music oriented Record Mirror.

Contributors
Contributors included Garry Bushell, Sandy Robertson, Giovanni Dadomo, Mick Middles, Phil Sutcliffe,  Geoff Barton, John Robb, Phil Bell, Mick Sinclair, Caroline Coon, Antonella Gambotto, Vivien Goldman, Jonh  Ingham, Alan Moore (a.k.a. "Curt Vile"), Lizo Mzimba, John Peel, Barbara Charone, Edwin Pouncey (a.k.a. "Savage Pencil"), Cathi Unsworth, Jon Ronson, Jon Savage, Sylvie Simmons, Penny Valentine, Marguerite Van Cook, Mary Anne Hobbs, Mat Snow, Johnny Waller, James Brown (who went on to form Loaded), Andy Ross (who wrote as "Andy Hurt" and went on to form Food Records), Steve Lamacq, Kev F. Sutherland and Russ Carvell's UT strip, and photographers Michael Putland, Ian Dickson, Jill Furmanovsky,  Andy Phillips, Steve Payne, Virginia Turbett, Tony Mottram, Ross Halfin and Janette Beckman.

Notes

References

External links

 Comic strips that were published in Sounds by Alan Moore
 Reviews and features published in Sounds by Mick Sinclair
 Photos published in Sounds by Simon Clegg

1970 establishments in the United Kingdom
1991 disestablishments in the United Kingdom
Defunct magazines published in the United Kingdom
English-language magazines
Magazines established in 1970
Magazines disestablished in 1991
Magazines published in London
Music magazines published in the United Kingdom
Weekly magazines published in the United Kingdom